The bush blackcap (Sylvia nigricapillus) is a species of bird in the family Sylviidae. It is endemic to South Africa and Eswatini. Its natural habitats are subtropical or tropical moist montane forests and subtropical or tropical high-altitude shrubland. It is threatened by habitat loss.

References

 Del Hoyo, J.; Elliot, A. & Christie D. (editors). (2007). Handbook of the Birds of the World. Volume 12: Picathartes to Tits and Chickadees. Lynx Edicions.

External links
 Bush blackcap - Species text in The Atlas of Southern African Birds.

Sylvia (bird)
Birds of Southern Africa
Birds described in 1818
Taxa named by Louis Jean Pierre Vieillot
Taxonomy articles created by Polbot